The Dr. Beauregard Martin Brooks House is an historic landmark house in Bath Springs, Tennessee, United States.  The house was built in 1900 by Beauregard Martin Brooks, a medical doctor, who was then setting up his practice in Bath Springs. The first two-story house to be built in Bath Springs, it contains seven rooms and two halls. There are porches on both the front and back.

It was listed on the National Register of Historic Places in 1992. As of the first decade of the 21st century, it was still owned and occupied by members of the Brooks family.

References

Houses completed in 1900
Houses in Decatur County, Tennessee
Houses on the National Register of Historic Places in Tennessee
National Register of Historic Places in Decatur County, Tennessee